DBR may refer to:

 Daniel Bernard Roumain, composer and violinist
 DBR Class of diesel locomotive, New Zealand
 De Bellis Renationis, renaissance wargaming rules
 Design-based research in the learning sciences
 Deuterium bromide, chemical formula DBr
 Distributed Bragg reflector, used in waveguides
 Dowel bar retrofit, highway crack treatment
 Drum-Buffer-Rope, in the theory of constraints
 ДБР, State Bureau of Investigation (Ukraine)

Codes 
 Bad Doberan, Germany, vehicle license plate
 Derby Road (Ipswich) railway station, National Rail code DBR
 DutchBird, airline ICAO code DBR
 Dobrolet (low-cost airline), airline ICAO code DBR